The Mainichi Film Award for Best Actress is a film award given at the Mainichi Film Awards.

Award Winners

References

Film awards for lead actress
Awards established in 1947
1947 establishments in Japan
Lists of films by award
Actress